Wang Chang-hui (born 4 October 1918) was a Chinese trade unionist and politician. She was among the first group of women elected to the Legislative Yuan in 1948.

Biography
Wang was born in Nanjing in October 1918. She was educated at Nanjing Zhongnan Middle School and Shanghai Liangjiang Women's Sports Teachers College, after which she attended National Chengchi University. During the Second Sino-Japanese War she was a member of the Women's Mobilization Committee of the Ninth War Zone and chaired the Hubei Women's Anti-Enemy Association. She moved to Hankou, where she became director of the Hankou Women's Association and a member of the Education Committee of Hankou Federation of Trade Unions. She married Ting Yu-chuan, with whom she had three children.

In the 1948 elections for the Legislative Yuan, Wang was elected to parliament as one of the women trade union representatives. She relocated to Taiwan during the Chinese Civil War, where she remained a member of the Legislative Yuan until 1991. During her time in parliament she served as convener of the Transportation Committee.

References

1918 births
National Chengchi University alumni
Chinese educators
Chinese trade unionists
20th-century Chinese women politicians
Members of the Kuomintang
Members of the 1st Legislative Yuan
Members of the 1st Legislative Yuan in Taiwan
Date of death unknown